NIWA Cloud Application Platform is a platform as a service (PaaS) cloud computing platform for developing and hosting web application.

Web applications run in several containers in the cloud. This allows you to scale applications automatically: while the number of requests to the application grows, resources are allocated automatically.

Supported features/restrictions
Currently, the supported programming language Perl (PSGI interface only).
In the future we plan to support programming languages are Ruby (Rack interface) and Python (WSGI interface).

Perl

An example of the smallest applications 
 .../hello_world.psgi
my $app = sub {
    my $env = shift;
    return [ '200',
           [ 'Content-Type' => 'text/plain' ],
           [ "Hello World" ] ];
};

Perl links 
  PSGI - Perl Web Server Gateway Interface Specification

Cloud platforms